Chhuikhadan is a city in Khairagarh-Chhuikhadan-Gandai district in the state of Chhattisgarh, India. Formerly, it was the part of Rajnandgaon District.

Geography
It has an average elevation of 337? metres (1105 ft).

History
Chhuikhadan was a native princely state of India during the British period.  It is also called Kondaka.  After the independence of India, it was included in Madhya Pradesh, after which it is presently in Chhattisgarh.  Chhuikhadan State was established in the year 1750 by Mahant Roop Das Bairagi. Chhuikhadan State was ruled by Bairagi rulers. This state was of 174 square miles, out of which 27,907 acres were cultivated and 48,538 acres were cultivable.  In 1870 there were 120 villages in this state with a total population of 13,281.  The population of this state in 1941 was 32,731.

Demographics
 India census, Chhuikhadan had a population of 6418. Males constitute 50% of the population and females 50%. Chhuikhadan has an average literacy rate of 71%, higher than the national average of 59.5%; with male literacy of 79% and female literacy of 63%. 12% of the population is under 6 years of age.

References

Cities and towns in Rajnandgaon district